Nawabganj is a city in Barabanki district in the state of Uttar Pradesh, India. It is a tehsil and nagar palika for Barabanki town. It is one of the constituent entities of Barabanki city, which is District HQ of Barabanki district.

History
Nawabganj has been known as such since the Nawabi.

Battle of Nawabganj

Battle of Nawabganj was a conflict between rebel sepoys, troops of Oudh State and local Taluqdars and troops of East India Company from 12 to 14 June 1857 during Indian Mutiny.

During the Sepoy war of 1857–1858 the whole of the Bara Banki taluqdars joined the mutineers, but offered no serious resistance after the capture of Lucknow. In the battle of Nawabganj in 1857 at Nawabganj Sir Hope Grant defeated the revolutionaries. Raja Balbhadra Singh Chehlari along with other 1000 revolutionaries were killed in action while fighting British at Obri around 2 km from Barabanki on the confluence of riverlets Rait and Jamuria.

British Rule
During the British rule Nawabganj headquarters of tehsil and pargana of same name. Area of Nawabganj Pargana around 1878 was 79 square miles and it was bounded in North by Ramnagar and Fatehpur, on the east by Daryabad, on the west by Dewa, and on south by Partabganj. Out of 77 villages, 44 were taluqdari and 33 Mufrad. Out of 44 taluqdari villages 25 were held by Jahngirabad Estate, the rest were divided between several neighbouring estates. Nawabganj contained village of Bara Banki which had civil railway station having junction on Oudh and Rohilkhand Railway (about half a mile north of the town).

Geography
It has an average elevation of 93 metres (305 feet).

Demographics
 India census, Nawabganj had a population of 75,087. Males constitute 52% of the population and females 48%. Nawabganj has an average literacy rate of 66%, higher than the national average of 59.5%: male literacy is 70%, and female literacy is 62%. In Nawabganj, 12% of the population is under 6 years of age.

Administration

Tehsil Nawabganj

Tehsil Nawabganj has 4 Block panchayats, they are:
 Banki
 Dewa
 Harakh
 Masauli

Municipal Board Nawabganj

The Nawabganj Municipal Board (or Nagar Palika Parishad Nawabganj ) was constituted on 16 July 1884, under the North-Western provinces and Oudh Municipalities Act, 1883. According to census of 2001 Nagar Palika Parishad Nawabganj covers an area of 12 km² with population of 75,741. It consists of seven sections for providing civic amenities to its citizens, they are:
 Revenue Section
 Public Works Section
 Health & Sanitation Section
 Water Works
 Street Light
 Nazul
 Accounts, Establishment & Records

Nagar Palika Parishad Nawabganj has 25 wards. They are:

Health infrastructure
Tehsil Nawabganj has following health infrastructure:
 Health centres – 7
 PHCs – 8
 Sub centres – 17

References

Cities and towns in Barabanki district